Chipped beef is a form of pressed, salted and dried beef that has been sliced into thin pieces. Some makers smoke the dried beef for more flavor. The modern product consists of small, thin, flexible leaves of partially dried beef, generally sold compressed together in jars or flat in plastic packets. The processed meat producer Hormel once described it as "an air-dried product that is similar to bresaola, but not as tasty."

Uses

Chipped beef could be used to make frizzled beef (creamed chipped beef or SOS in military slang), or with eggs.

Availability

Chipped beef is served in many diners and restaurants in the United States as a breakfast item. It is popular among the veteran community who generally refer to it by the dysphemism "Shit On a Shingle"; chipped beef in milk gravy (or "S.O.S.") is a common traditional meal which is served in all branches of the United States Armed Forces due to its reasonable nutritional profile, ease and speed of preparing, and relatively low cost to produce in large quantities (i.e. in quantities sufficient to properly feed an entire military outpost). Creamed chipped beef is standard fare on many such diner menus, especially in the Mid-Atlantic, but has become harder to find in chain restaurants that serve breakfast; among the restaurants still offering chipped beef on toast are Golden Corral and Silver Diner. IHOP no longer offers this on their menus, having substituted sausage gravy, and the same is true for Cracker Barrel restaurants. It is also available from companies such as Stouffer's in a frozen form which can be put on top of separately-prepared toast; it is typically quite salty. For instance, Stouffer's creamed chipped beef contains 540 mg sodium per 140 kcal serving, down only slightly from 590 mg per 140 kcal serving in 2010. 

The mixture was also, at one point, available from both Freezer Queen and Banquet as "hot sandwich toppers"; as of late 2007, Freezer Queen no longer makes this product, and the Banquet variety is rarely found.  Finally, both the Esskay Meat Company of Baltimore and Knauss Foods make a refrigerated version of creamed chipped beef which can be easily microwaved. The meat itself is also available for purchase under the Knauss and Carson's Brand names. Steak-umm is used as a substitute.

Chipped beef on toast
Chipped beef on toast (or creamed chipped beef on toast) is a dish comprising a white sauce and rehydrated slivers of dried beef, served on toasted bread. Hormel recommends flavoring the dish with Worcestershire sauce. Chipped beef is also often served on bagels, English muffins, biscuits, home fries, rice, mashed potato and in casserole.

U.S. military cuisine
In the United States, chipped beef on toast was commonly served to service members of the United States Armed Forces from World War I through Vietnam. It was considered emblematic of the military experience and consequently also served to Boy Scouts of the era. In American military slang it is commonly referred to by the dysphemism "Shit On a Shingle" (SOS).

According to "We Are The Mighty", the dish first appears in the 1910 Manual for Army Cooks, where a recipe for feeding 60 men can be found as below:

Wentworth and Flexner cite no origin for the term, but noted "shingle" for slice of toast has had "some use since 1935" in the U.S. Army, mostly in the expression "shit on a shingle", and the latter had "wide World War II Army use".

Chipped Beef on Toast (S.O.S.) is the title of a book of military humor. In his World War II book Band of Brothers, Stephen E. Ambrose evokes the military basics:

See also

 Biscuits and gravy
 List of dried foods
 List of military food topics
 List of sandwiches
 List of toast dishes

References

External links
 SOS recipe of Bob's Coffee Shop in Fountain Valley, California
 The Cookbook of the U.S. Navy, 1945 recipe

Dried meat
Military food of the United States
Beef sandwiches